Ko Tin Hom is a village in Lam Tsuen, Tai Po District, Hong Kong.

Status recognition
Ko Tin Hom is a recognised village under the New Territories Small House Policy.

See also
 Chuen Shui Tseng, Lung A Pai and Tin Liu Ha, nearby villages

References

Villages in Tai Po District, Hong Kong
Lam Tsuen